The Malay bay massacre occurred in proximity of Malay Bay (Wungaran), situated in the northern region of Arnhem Land in the Northern Territory, involved the killing of six Macassan fishermen by Indigenous Australians in October 1892. Suspected leader of the perpetrators, Wandy Wandy, was captured and later executed by hanging for the killings.

Description
A pair of Macassan fishing vessels, each with a crew of three, anchored in Malay Bay after running short of water and other important provisions. Strong north-easterly winds forced one of the ships onto the shore, resulting in a large hole being smashed into the hull. The stranded crew sought the aid of a local group of Indigenous Australians in finding the nearest settlement. Some time after their stranding, the entire Macassan party were ambushed and killed by a group of Aboriginal people, led by Wandy Wandy, who had earlier been convicted of murder.

References

Massacres by Indigenous Australians
Massacres in 1892
Murder in the Northern Territory
19th century in the Northern Territory
Deaths by firearm in the Northern Territory
1892 murders in Australia
History of Australia (1851–1900)